William de Burgh (c.1160–winter 1205/06) was the founder of the House of Burgh (later surnamed Burke or Bourke) in Ireland and elder brother of Hubert de Burgh, 1st Earl of Kent and Geoffrey de Burgh, Bishop of Ely.

In Ireland

William de Burgh was the eldest son of William de Burgh and his wife, Alice, of Burgh-next-Aylsham, Norfolk or Burgh, Suffolk, and had three brothers: Hubert, Earl of Kent, Thomas, and Geoffrey, Bishop of Ely. Ellis has made a case that William's father was Walter de Burgh but notes this is "highly conjectural". 

William was "one of the new wave of Anglo-Normans to come to Ireland with John, lord of Ireland, in 1185" and has been described as "one of the most prominent men involved in the annexation of the kingdom of Limerick in the last quarter of the twelfth century".

Henry II of England appointed him Governor of Limerick and granted him vast estates in Leinster and Munster. William de Burgh's lands were centred along the River Suir from Tibberaghny to Clonmel and around Kilfeakle in Tipperary, and along the River Shannon from Limerick to Lough Derg. His castles at Tibberaghny (County Kilkenny), Kilsheelan, Ardpatrick and Kilfeacle were used to protect King John's northern borders of Waterford and Lismore whilst his castles at Carrigogunnell and Castleconnell were used to protect Limerick. He was granted Tibberaghny Castle in 1200, and was Seneschal (Royal Governor) of Munster from 1201 to 1203.

Marriage and alliance

Sometime during the 1190s, William de Burgh allied himself with the King of Thomond (either Domnall Mór Ó Briain (d.1194) or his son, Muirchertach) and, in 1193, William married Domnall Mór Ó Briain's daughter. This alliance probably took place during the reign of Muirchertach, since Domnall Mór had been at war with the Normans until his death. At any rate no more wars are recorded between the two sides for the rest of the decade. According to the Annals of Inisfallen, in 1201, William and the sons of Domnall Mór led a major joint military expedition into Desmond, slaying Amlaíb Ua Donnabáin among others.

Between 1199 and 1202, William de Burgh led military campaigns in Desmond (with the aid of the Ó Briain). Success in the west and south allowed de Burgh to conquer the Kingdom of Connacht which, though he had been granted (probably before 1195) by John, he had never occupied. The King of Connacht, Cathal Crobhdearg Ua Conchobair (O'Connor), fought a successful counter-attack against Anglo-Norman castles in Munster (including de Burgh's castle of Castleconnell). Further fighting led to the loss of three castles and property, all of which was eventually retrieved (with the exception of much of Connacht).

Connacht
In 1200, "Cathal Crobhdearg Ua Conchobair went into Munster, to the son of Mac Carthy and William de Burgh to solicit their aid." This marked the start of William de Burgh's interest in the province. Cathal Crobhdearg Ua Conchobair (King of Connacht, 1190–1224) faced much opposition (mainly from within his own family) and wished to engage de Burgh's aid to further secure his position. In 1201, William and Ua Conchobair led an army from Limerick to Tuam and finally to Boyle. Ua Conchobair's rival, Cathal Carragh Ua Conchobair, marched at the head of his army but was killed in a de Burgh/Ua Conchobair onslaught after a week of skirmishing between the two sides.

William and Ua Conchobair then travelled to Iar Connacht and stayed at Cong for Easter. Here, William de Burgh (and the sons of Rory O'Flaherty) conspired to kill Ua Conchobair but the plot was foiled (apparently by holy oaths they were made to swear by the local Coarb family). However, when de Burgh demanded payment for himself and his retinue, a battle broke out with over seven hundred of de Burgh's followers said to have been killed. William, however, managed to return to Limerick. In the following year, 1202, William returned and took revenge for the destruction of his army a year earlier. He took the title "Lord of Connacht" in 1203.

Death

He died during the Winter of 1205/06 and was interred at the Augustinian Priory of Athassel in Golden which he had founded c.1200. The Annals of the Four Masters recorded his passing thus:

"William Burke plundered Connacht, as well churches as territories; but God and the saints took vengeance on him for that; for he died of a singular disease, too shameful to be described."

Family
William de Burgh's wife was the daughter of Domnall Mór Ó Briain, King of Thomond, whom he married in around 1193. A late medieval genealogy found in the Book of Lecan (dated c.1397-1418) records his marriage to an unnamed daughter of Donmal Mor mac Turlough O'Brien, and the descent of the Earls of Ulster and Clanricarde from their son Richard. William de Burgh had three sons and at least one daughter: 

 Richard Mór de Burgh, 1st Lord of Connaught
 Hubert de Burgh, Bishop of Limerick.
 William de Burgh (the younger), Sheriff of Connacht

Genealogy

References (Genealogy)
 A New History of Ireland, volume IX, Oxford, 1984;
 Earls of Ulster and Lords of Connacht, 1205–1460 (De Burgh, De Lacy and Mortimer), p. 170;
 Mac William Burkes: Mac William Iochtar (de Burgh), Lords of Lower Connacht and Viscounts of Mayo, 1332–1649, p. 171;
 Burke of Clanricard: Mac William Uachtar (de Burgh), Lords of Upper Connacht and Earls of Clanricard, 1332–1722.
 The Tribes and customs of Hy-Many, John O'Donovan, 1843
 The History of Mayo, Hubert T. Knox. 1908.
 The Surnames of Ireland, Edward MacLysaght, Dublin, 1978.
 Lower Mac William and Viscounts of Mayo, 1332–1649, in A New History of Ireland IX, pp.235-36, Oxford, 1984 (reprinted 2002).
 The Anglo-Normans in Co. Galway: the process of colonization, Patrick Holland, Journal of the Galway Archaeological and Historical Society, vol. 41, (1987–88)
 Burke:People and Places, Eamonn de Burca, Dublin, 1995.
 The Anglo-Norman landscape in County Galway; land-holdings, castles and settlements, Patrick Holland, J.G.A.& H.S., vol. 49 (1997)
 Annals of Ulster at CELT: Corpus of Electronic Texts at University College Cork
 Annals of Tigernach at CELT: Corpus of Electronic Texts at University College Cork
Revised edition of McCarthy's synchronisms at Trinity College Dublin.

See also
House of Burgh, an Anglo-Norman and Hiberno-Norman dynasty founded in 1193
Hubert de Burgh, 1st Earl of Kent (c.1170–before 1243), Chief Justiciar and Regent of England
Geoffrey de Burgh (c.1180–1228), English Bishop of Ely
Earl of Ulster, earldom created in the Peerage of Ireland
Lord of Connaught, title claimed in the Peerage of Ireland
Burke Civil War 1333-38
Mac William Íochtar Mac William Íochtar (Lower Mac William) or Mayo (Lower Connaught) Burkes
Clanricarde (Mac William Uachtar/Upper Mac William) or Galway (Upper Connaught) Burkes
Viscount Mayo, viscountcy created in the Peerage of Ireland in 1627
Earl of Mayo, earldom created in the Peerage of Ireland in 1785

References

1160s births
1206 deaths
Normans in Ireland
Anglo-Normans
People from the Borough of Great Yarmouth
Nobility from County Limerick
People from County Tipperary
William
12th-century Irish people
13th-century Irish people